The women's 100 metres at the 2018 European Athletics Championships took place at the Olympiastadion on 6 and 7 August.

Records

Schedule

Results

Round 1
First 3 in each heat (Q) and the next 4 fastest (q) advanced to the semifinals. The top 11 ranked athletes received a bye to the semifinals.

Wind:
Heat 1: -0.7 m/s, Heat 2: -0.9 m/s, Heat 3: -0.2 m/s

Semifinals

First 2 in each heat (Q) and the next 2 fastest (q) advanced to the final.

Wind:
Heat 1: +0.2 m/s, Heat 2: +0.1 m/s, Heat 3: +0.3 m/s

* Athletes who received a bye to the semifinals

Final
The medals were determined in the final.

Wind: 0.0 m/s

References

100 W
100 metres at the European Athletics Championships
Euro